Antoine Carraby (born December 11, 1961), better known by his stage name DJ Yella, is an American DJ, rapper, record producer and film director from Los Angeles, California.

DJ Yella began his career as a member of the World Class Wreckin' Cru along with Dr. Dre. He later joined the pioneering gangsta rap group N.W.A (originally composed of Dr. Dre, Ice Cube, MC Ren, Arabian Prince and Eazy-E) and became the least vocal but longest-lasting member of the group. His first and only studio album One Mo Nigga ta Go was released in 1996 through Street Life Records and was dedicated to Eazy-E. After the release of the album he left the music industry to direct pornographic films until 2011, when he started working on a new album called West Coastin.

In 2016, he was inducted into the Rock and Roll Hall of Fame as a member of N.W.A.

Early life
Antoine Carraby was born in Compton, California, on December 11, 1961 and raised  in Los Angeles.
He was passionate about music from a young age. He grew up listening to funk music and learned to play the drums. As a teenager, he performed at various clubs of Los Angeles by the name of Yella which was inspired by Tom Tom Club's Mr. Yellow. After watching Run-D.M.C. perform in California for the first time, he and Dre both were amazed to see them on-stage with nothing more than a DJ scratching. They attempted to make a few records themselves in the nightclub Eve After Dark, owned by Alonzo Williams.

Career

Yella began DJ'ing as a teenager in a local club called Eve After Dark. At the club he met aspiring DJ Dr. J, later to become member Dr. Dre of N.W.A. Eve After Dark had a back room with a small four-track studio. In this studio, Yella and Dre recorded several demos. In their first recording session, they recorded a song entitled "Surgery".
Influenced by Grandmaster Flash, Yella and Dre formed the World Class Wreckin' Cru in the early '80s,  which released its debut album under the Kru-Cut label in 1985. The group would become stars of the electro-hop scene that dominated early-mid 1980s West Coast hip hop. "Surgery", recorded and released prior to the group's official formation, was their first hit, selling 50,000 copies in Compton alone. DJ Yella and Dr. Dre also performed mixes for local radio station KDAY, boosting ratings for its afternoon rush-hour show The Traffic Jam.

Along with Dre, Yella helped produce Eazy-E's debut album Eazy-Duz-It and the three N.W.A albums, with the first being a compilation album translating into millions of sales. Along with Dr. Dre and Arabian Prince, Yella co-produced J.J. Fad's gold certified debut (Super Sonic) and also Michel'le's (self-titled) album and contributed to The D.O.C.'s 1989 album No One Can Do It Better (also produced by Dre). Jerry Heller, in his 2006 memoir Ruthless, witnessed Dre and Yella's work together, writing that the two had an "almost eerie understanding", as they crafted high quality beats and productions with almost no words or full sentences needing to be spoken.

Yella remained close to Eazy and stayed on production duties at Ruthless Records after the acrimonious breakup of N.W.A. He produced J.J. Fad's second album Not Just a Fad (1990), Yomo & Maulkie's album Are U Xperienced? (1991), two tracks from Eazy-E's It's On (Dr. Dre) 187um Killa (1993), the gold-selling hit single "Foe tha Love of $" from Bone Thugs-N-Harmony's Creepin on ah Come Up EP, Menajahtwa's album Cha-licious, and tracks from H.W.A.'s Az Much Ass Azz U Want E.P. (all three from 1994). He also produced Eazy's final album Str8 off tha Streetz of Muthaphukkin Compton, released about a year after his death in 1995 from AIDS.

Yella released his 1996 debut solo album One Mo Nigga ta Go on Street Life Records as a tribute to Eazy-E, featuring members of the Ruthless "family tree" Kokane, B.G. Knocc Out, and Dresta, rhyming over his productions. The album peaked at number 82 on the Billboard 200 albums chart and at number 23 on the Top R&B/Hip-Hop Albums chart in the US.

After this record he retired from music to embark on a 12-year career directing and producing pornographic films. Yella says he produced more than 300 adult films.

In November 2011 Yella began working on a new album, entitled West Coastin, which was scheduled for release in the summer of 2012. This album remains unreleased as of 2022.

Yella was played by Neil Brown Jr. in the 2015 N.W.A biopic, Straight Outta Compton.  He is portrayed as very interested in sex and women, and also as less aggressive than the other members and unwilling to engage in conflict with Ice Cube.

In April 2016, Yella reunited with the former members of N.W.A at Coachella.

 Discography 
Studio albums

Collaboration albumswith World Class Wreckin' Cru World Class (1985)
 Rapped in Romance (1986)with N.W.A.'''
 N.W.A. and the Posse (1987)
 Straight Outta Compton (1988)
 100 Miles and Runnin' (1990)
 Niggaz4Life'' (1991)

Selected works

Filmography

References

External links

 
 DJ Yella at AllMusic
 

1961 births
Living people
20th-century American male musicians
21st-century American male musicians
20th-century American rappers
21st-century American rappers
African-American DJs
African-American male rappers
African-American record producers
American hip hop DJs
American hip hop record producers
Musicians from Compton, California
N.W.A members
Rappers from Los Angeles
Record producers from California
Ruthless Records artists
American pornographers